Bouzillé is a former commune in the Maine-et-Loire department in western France. On 15 December 2015, it was merged into the new commune Orée-d'Anjou.

People from Bouzillé
 Paul Poupard (born 1930), Roman Catholic cardinal

See also
Communes of the Maine-et-Loire department

References

External links

Official site

Former communes of Maine-et-Loire